The 2010–11 Kent Football League season was the 45th in the history of Kent Football League a football competition in England.

League table

The league featured 15 clubs which competed in the previous season, along with one new club:
VCD Athletic, demoted from the Isthmian League

League table

References

External links

2010-11
9